Setobaudinia umbadayi is a species of air-breathing land snail, a terrestrial pulmonate gastropod mollusc in the family Camaenidae. The species was found during an expedition led by Frank Koehler on the islands off the Kimberely Coast in 2017. It was amongst other species that were previously unknown to scientists found on the islands.

References

 Bamford, M. 2017. http://www.abc.net.au/news/2017-01-18/150-new-snail-species-discovered-on-kimberley-islands/8192326

umbadayi
Gastropods of Australia
Gastropods described in 2017